Stadtgrenze station is a Nuremberg U-Bahn station, located on the U1.
Although it is officially tagged Nuremberg Stadtgrenze, its buildings are located in Fürth. Stadtgrenze means town limit in German.

History
As the U1 line was built from East to West, the opening of this station and the one immediately to the West (Jakobinenstraße station) on the same day marked the beginning of subway service to Fürth, replacing the tram which had ceased serving Fürth the year prior.

References

Nuremberg U-Bahn stations
Railway stations in Germany opened in 1982
Buildings and structures completed in 1982
1982 establishments in West Germany